Goodhope is an unincorporated community in southwestern Douglas County, Missouri, United States. The community lies on the south side of the intersection of Missouri State Routes T and O and just west of the intersection of Route T with Missouri Route 76.

Goodhope had a post office from 1895 until 1923.

References

Unincorporated communities in Douglas County, Missouri
1895 establishments in Missouri
Unincorporated communities in Missouri